North Carolina Highway 183 (NC 183) is a primary state highway in the U.S. state of North Carolina.  It traverses from US 221, in the community of Linville Falls, to NC 181, near the community of Jonas Ridge.

Route description

The route serves mainly as a connector between Linville Falls and the rest of Burke County; it also serves as an alternate route to the Blue Ridge Parkway, which parallels the route. The route also has access to the Linville Falls and Gorge Wilderness Area.  Part of the route is shared with NC Bike Route 2.

Where NC 183 begins, it is flanked by nearby McDowell and Avery counties. The highway also crosses briefly into McDowell county twice, in two short successions, in Linville Falls.  Nearly halfway along the highway, a spur road from the Blue Ridge Parkway does a fly-over above the highway (no access).

NC 183, with continuation via NC 181, can be considered an alternate route of US 221, bypassing Altamont and Crossnore.

Scenic byways
NC 183 is part of one scenic byway in the state (indicated by a Scenic Byways sign).

Pisgah Loop Scenic Byway is a  loop byway. The route is not recommended for recreational vehicles or buses, and four-wheel-drive vehicles are required for unpaved portions.  It is noted for its close proximity to the Blue Ridge Parkway, the Linville River and Falls, and a rare montane (mountain wetland).  NC 183 makes up the northern segment of the loop, which also includes Old NC Highway 105 (SR 1238), NC 126, Fish Hatchery Road (SR 1254/SR 1240), and NC 181.

History
NC 183 was established around 1930 as a new primary route between NC 105 and NC 181, in northern Burke County.  In 1954, NC 183 replaced part of NC 105, into Linville Falls, to its current western terminus at US 221.

Junction list

References

External links

 
 NCRoads.com: N.C. 183

183
Transportation in Burke County, North Carolina
Transportation in McDowell County, North Carolina